Umbrtka is a metal band from Plzeň, Czech Republic. The band describe their music, which incorporates black, doom, industrial metal elements and is influenced by Czech underground, as 'black' metal. The main themes of their lyrics are deserted industrial areas, factories, power plants, railways, dirty streets, trains, and other industrial elements.

'Umbrtka' is a name for a 'deity' which rules the grey industrial world. It is based on a working-class man called Ivo Krátký, formerly employed in Skart, Plzeň's scrapyard which, within the band's lyrics, is considered a 'temple of labor'.

Discography

Full albums
Zašpinit slunce (To Pollute the Sun) (2000)
Dělnický a bezdomovecký šedý metal (Worker's and Homeless Gray Metal ) (2001)
Kladivo pracuje na 110% (The Hammer Works at 110%) (2001)
Kovostroj plzeňských pánů práce (Metalmachine of Plzeň's Labour Lords) (2001)
Hymny šedé síly (Hymns of the Grey Force) (2002)
Ozvěny špíny (Echoes of Dirt) (2002)
Betonová opona (The Concrete Curtain) (2002)
Nad propastí dne (Above the Abyss of the Day) (2003)
Melša - Frank Zappa meets Darkthrone (2003)
Paměti špinavé lávky (Memories of the Dirty Footbridge) (2004)
Lití podzimního asfaltu (The Casting of Autumn Asphalt) (2005)
Páně & Uhelná pánev (The Lord & The Coal Basin) (2 cd,2008)
Úplná demontáž lidstva (The Complete Disassembly of Mankind) (2009)
Kovový háj (The Metal Grove) (2010)
IVO - Industriální Velké Obrození (The Great Industrial Renaissance) (2010)
Spočinutí (Resting) (2011)
KKW (2012)
Selement (2012)
V dešti mech (Moss in the Rain) (2014)
Hlavní stroj (The Master Machine) (2016)

EPs 
Jaro nevidět (2011, digital download)

LPs 
Kovový háj (2012)
Úplná demontáž lidstva (2013)

Demos 
The Hand of Nothingness (2003)

External links
facebook.com/umbrtka - official Facebook page
Generální úřad pro tmu (The General Office for the Dark) - video
Vezeme bábu (We Carry the Beldame) - video
Kraftvarg (Burzum/Kraftwerk cover) - video
Šedesátiny (60th Birthday) - video
Stroje zůstanou (The Machines Shall Prevail) - video
Nabídka (Menu) - video
Transplzeňský hangár (Transpilsener Hangar; Darkthrone cover) - video
Teplárenský okruh (The Heat-station Circle) - video
Smrt v železe (Death in Iron) - video

Czech heavy metal musical groups
Musical quartets
Musical groups established in 1999
1999 establishments in the Czech Republic